The 1964 Buffalo Bulls football team represented the University at Buffalo in the 1964 NCAA University Division football season. The Bulls offense scored 177 points while the defense allowed 97 points.

Schedule

References

Buffalo
Buffalo Bulls football seasons
Buffalo Bulls football